Reginald Thomas Keys (born 1952) is the father of a British serviceman killed in the Iraq War. He stood in the 2005 general election as an anti-war independent candidate for in Sedgefield, a constituency held by the then Prime Minister, Tony Blair.

Biography
Keys is a founder member of the campaign group Military Families Against the War. His son, Lance Corporal Tom Keys, was one of six Royal Military Policemen killed by an Iraqi mob in Majar al-Kabir in June 2003.

Reg Keys was an ambulance paramedic for 19 years in Solihull before retiring to Llanuwchllyn, Bala in North Wales. In the 2005 UK general election, he stood against the then Prime Minister, Tony Blair, in the Sedgefield constituency. Keys declared at the outset of the campaign that he had been a Labour Party voter and was still basically socialist, but that he was seeking election as a candidate opposed to Blair's policy on the Iraq War. He claimed that by electing him, voters could keep the Labour Party in power but with Gordon Brown as the likely Prime Minister rather than Blair. Former Independent MP Martin Bell urged the other parties to withdraw their candidates as removing a supporter of the war from office would send a message to President Bush and other World Leaders who had supported him. During the campaign, UK newspaper The Guardian'''s Stuart Jeffries asked Keys, "Is it difficult to be a political candidate in these circumstances, when you are still clearly grieving?", to which he replied "Yes it is. […] I feel, though, that I have a responsibility to Tom. I keep going back to the words of a widow of a man who died on the Kursk […]. She said: 'If you betray your country you are a traitor and you will go to prison. But if your country betrays you, what can you do?' I think I have an answer to that: we can use our vote to get rid of those people who betrayed my son and other men like him. That's what I want the people of Sedgefield to do."

Bob Clay, the left-wing former Labour MP for Sunderland North, acted as Keys' agent. Keys won 4,252 votes (10.3% of the total), coming in fourth place, less than 700 votes behind the Liberal Democrats candidate and about 1,700 votes behind the Conservative candidate. Blair won with 24,421 votes (58.9%).

At the declaration Keys made a widely publicised speech about the controversy over the decision to go to war and the alleged deceptions made by Blair over the reasons for going to war. Blair listened to the speech with an expressionless face. Reviewing the 2005 election's most memorable moments the BBC noted:
Independent Reg Keys polled 10% of the vote in Tony Blair's Sedgefield constituency on an anti-war ticket. But it was his moving lament for the son he lost in Iraq that will linger in the memory – not for Mr Keys' words necessarily, although these were powerful enough, but for Tony Blair's expression as he listened to them. 'I hope in my heart that one day the prime minister will be able to say sorry, that one day he will say sorry to the families of the bereaved,' said Mr Keys. Mr Blair's attempt to look impassive and expressionless will, inevitably, be replayed time and again whenever the story of his premiership is told on television.

Although Keys did not defeat Blair at the ballot box, his campaign did not stop. The British government is now facing a series of legal challenges launched by the families of British soldiers killed in the Iraq war. Lawyers acting on behalf of ten families and anti-war organisations presented evidence to the International Criminal Court that Britain had committed war crimes in its participation in the Iraq war. They argued that British forces were directed in a manner disproportionate to the stated objective of the war, namely disarming Iraq of its weapons of mass destruction. They further argued that there is, at the very least, a reasonable suspicion that the Prime Minister committed Britain to war on the basis of regime change. This charge is all the more serious in the light of the fact that Blair was given unambiguous advice from the Attorney General and the Foreign Office that to invade Iraq on the basis of regime change would be illegal.

Keys and other families of British soldiers killed in Iraq are also launching a separate legal action if the Prime Minister does not convene a full, public, and independent inquiry into the legality of the Iraq war. Using the European Convention on Human Rights (ECHR) and its British counterpart, the Human Rights Act, they will argue that, if it can be shown that soldiers were sent to war on an illegal basis, it would have been an infringement of their Article 2 right under the ECHR which imposes an obligation on governments to protect the lives of those under their authority and control.

In 2015, the BBC announced that it was to produce a biographical drama film about Keys' life called Reg''. In the film, broadcast on 6 June 2016, Keys was portrayed by Academy Award-nominated actor Tim Roth and the script was by Jimmy McGovern and Robert Pugh.

Spectre
In August 2006, Reg Keys and other relatives of military personnel killed in Iraq announced the creation of a new political party named Spectre. The party's aims and objectives included bringing the Government to account for misleading Parliament over Iraq, supporting wounded troops returning from Iraq, raising serving soldiers’ concerns over Iraq and highlight equipment and system failures. At the launch it was stated that the party planned to contest more than 70 seats currently held by pro-war Labour MPs, including Foreign Secretary Margaret Beckett, Ruth Kelly, the Communities and Local Government secretary and Jack Straw, Leader of the Commons. Keys also aimed to stand candidates in Parliamentary by-elections.

In the event Spectre was never registered as a political party with the Electoral Commission, and did not contest any by-elections or any seat at the 2010 general election.

See also
 2005 United Kingdom general election

References

External links
 Vote for Reg Keys official campaign site
 A Sedgefield View A blogger in Sedgefield with a jaundiced eye
 Military Families Against the War official site
 Reg Keys' election night speech at Sedgefield Video — WMV (3.6Mb)
 The Man Who Challenged Blair The Contemporary Review, July 2005, by Stefan Simanowitz.
 Guardian - Doing It for Tom: Mr Keys Takes on the Prime Minister by Ed Vulliamy April 22, 2005
 CNN - Soldier father bid to unseat Blair April 21, 2005
 Reuters - Father of Slain Soldier Plots Blair "Regime Change" April 21, 2005
 Guardian - "I'll Hold Blair to Account" interview with Stuart Jeffries March 22, 2005

1952 births
Living people
Independent politicians in England
English anti–Iraq War activists
Independent British political candidates